The 2009 Basel Summer Ice Hockey is an ice hockey tournament that was held in Basel, Switzerland for the first time between 19 and 22 August 2009. All matches were played at host EHC Basel's home St. Jakob Arena. Six teams, split into two groups of three, took part.

Teams participating
The list of teams that were confirmed for the tournament are as listed:

 EHC Basel Sharks (host)
 Genève-Servette HC
 HC Davos
 Dinamo Minsk
 Bílí Tygři Liberec
 SKA Saint Petersburg

Group stage

Key
W (regulation win) – 3 pts.
OTW (overtime/shootout win) – 2 pts.
OTL (overtime/shootout loss) – 1 pt.
L (regulation loss) – 0 pts.

Group A

All times are local (UTC+2).

Group B

All times are local (UTC+2).

Placement stage

Fifth-place Match

All times are local (UTC+2).

Third-place Match

All times are local (UTC+2).

Final

All times are local (UTC+2).

Champions

References

External links

2009–10
2009–10 in Swiss ice hockey
2009–10 in Russian ice hockey
2009–10 in Czech ice hockey